is the 19th single by Japanese idol girl group Nogizaka46. The center position of the title track is held by Asuka Saito and Nanase Nishino. It was released on 11 October 2017. It reached number-one on the weekly Oricon Singles Chart with 851,000 copies sold. It was also number-one on the Billboard Japan Hot 100.

Release 
This single was released in 5 versions. Type-A, Type-B, Type-C, Type-D and a regular edition.

Track listing
All lyrics written by Yasushi Akimoto.

Type-A

Type-B

Type-C

Type-D

Regular Edition

Participating members

"Itsuka Dekiru kara Kyō Dekiru" 
Center: Asuka Saitō and Nanase Nishino

3rd Row: Mai Shinuchi, Yuri Saitō, Minami Hoshino, Rina Ikoma, Manatsu Akimoto, Hinako Kitano, Kana Nakada, Kazumi Takayama 

2nd Row: Yumi Wakatsuki, Sayuri Inoue, Sayuri Matsumura, Erika Ikuta, Marika Itō, Reika Sakurai, Misa Etō

1st Row: Miona Hori, Nanase Nishino, Asuka Saitō, Mai Shiraishi

Chart performance

Weekly

Oricon

Billboard Japan

Yearly

Billboard Japan

References

2017 singles
2017 songs
Japanese-language songs
Nogizaka46 songs
Oricon Weekly number-one singles
Billboard Japan Hot 100 number-one singles
Songs with lyrics by Yasushi Akimoto